Vivian Harris (born 1978) is a Guyanese boxer.

Vivian Harris may also refer to:
Vivian Beynon Harris (1906–1987), English writer
Vivian Harris (comedian) (1902-2000), comedian and chorus girl at the Apollo Theater

See also
Vivienne Harris (disambiguation)
Viv Harris, fictional character